Coed Gwempa is a Site of Special Scientific Interest in Carmarthen & Dinefwr,  Wales. It is managed by the Woodland Trust, who describe it as mixed native woodland and ancient trees with abundant floral species like bluebell, meadowsweet and dog violet. Dormice have also been observed.

See also
List of Sites of Special Scientific Interest in Carmarthen & Dinefwr

References

External links
Woodland Trust site Management Plan

Sites of Special Scientific Interest in Carmarthen & Dinefwr